Angelochori is a village in the municipal unit of Michaniona, in the Thessaloniki regional unit, Greece.

Cape Megalo Embolo (Μεγάλο έμβολο) or Karaburnu (Καραμπουρνού), the ancient Aeneium, is its northwesternmost tip.

Populated places in Thessaloniki (regional unit)